Tomato mottle mosaic virus is a Tobamovirus which infects Solanum lycopersicum. First detected in Mexico in 2013 from S. lycopersicum samples taken in 2009, ToMMV has since been found throughout the world. In 2014 some S. lycopersicum samples from Florida in 2010 and 2012 and a Nicotiana tabacum 'Xanthi nc' sample were retested using an assay that distinguishes ToMMV from other Tobamoviruses, especially the closely related (and initially suspected) Tomato mosaic virus and Tobacco mosaic virus. These samples tested positive for ToMMV, showing that ToMMV was widespread and had been for several years earlier than previously known.

Geographic distribution
 United States
 California, Florida, New York State, South Carolina
 Australia
 Brazil
 São Paulo
 China
 Gansu, Hainan, Hunan, Liaoning, Inner Mongolia, Shaanxi, the Tibet Autonomous Region, Yunnan
 Czech Republic in 2020
 Israel in 2014
 Iran
 Mexico
 Spain

References

External links
 

Tobamovirus
Viral plant pathogens and diseases